The Last Man is a 1955 West German drama film directed by Harald Braun and starring Hans Albers, Romy Schneider and Rudolf Forster. The film is a remake of the 1924 Weimar silent The Last Laugh, with the setting updated to post-war Germany.

It was shot at the Bavaria Studios in Munich and on location in Baden-Baden. The film's sets were designed by the art director Kurt Herlth and Robert Herlth.

Synopsis
A hotel employee loses his sense of self-respect when he is demoted.

Cast
 Hans Albers as Karl Knesebeck
 Romy Schneider as Niddy Hoevelmann
 Rudolf Forster as Herr Claasen
 Joachim Fuchsberger as Alwin Radspieler
 Camilla Spira as Sabine Hoevelmann
 Michael Heltau as Helmuth Buehler
 Michael Gebühr as Till / Pikkolo
 Heini Göbel as Onkel Max
 Walter Gross as Kellner Otto
 Peter Lühr as Onkel Udo
 Willy Stettner as Friseur Popp
 Milena von Eckhardt as Kellner Eugen
 Sabine Hahn
 Ursula von Reibnitz as Tante Alma
 Charlotte Witthauer as Tante Elsbeth
 Paul Bahlke as Kellner Enrico
 Franz Essel as Empfangschef Pichler
  as Der alte Krüger
 Peter Horn
 Karl Maria Schley as Kellner Eugen
 Gert Westphal
 Karl-Georg Saebisch as Jonas, der Kellner
 Peter Martin Urtel

References

Bibliography 
 Hake, Sabine. Popular Cinema of the Third Reich. University of Texas Press, 2001.

External links 
 

1955 films
1955 drama films
German drama films
West German films
1950s German-language films
Films directed by Harald Braun
Remakes of German films
Sound film remakes of silent films
Films set in hotels
Films shot at Bavaria Studios
German black-and-white films
1950s German films